Butto may refer to:

 José Butto, Venezuelan professional baseball player
 Buttō, a Japanese pagoda

See also
 Bhutto (disambiguation)